Serica mystaca is a species of scarab beetle in the family Scarabaeidae. It is found in 18 out of 50 US states.

References

Further reading

 

Melolonthinae
Beetles described in 1922
Beetles of the United States